Garry Emmanuel Shandling (November 29, 1949 – March 24, 2016) was an American actor, comedian, writer, director, and producer.

Shandling began his career writing for sitcoms, such as Sanford and Son and Welcome Back, Kotter. He made a successful stand-up performance on The Tonight Show Starring Johnny Carson where he became a frequent guest host. Shandling was, for a time, considered the leading contender to replace Johnny Carson. In 1986, he created It's Garry Shandling's Show, which aired on Showtime. It was nominated for four Emmy Awards (including one for Shandling) and lasted until 1990.

Shandling's second show, The Larry Sanders Show, began airing on HBO in 1992. He was nominated for 18 Emmy Awards for the show and won the Primetime Emmy Award for Outstanding Writing for a Comedy Series in 1998, along with Peter Tolan, for writing the series finale. In film, he had a recurring role in the Marvel Cinematic Universe, appearing in Iron Man 2 and Captain America: The Winter Soldier. He also lent his voice to Verne the turtle in Over the Hedge. Shandling's final performance was as the voice of Ikki in the live-action remake of The Jungle Book, and the film was dedicated to his memory.

During his four-decade career, Shandling was nominated for 19 Primetime Emmy Awards and two Golden Globe Awards, along with many other awards and nominations. He served as host of the Grammy Awards four times and as host of the Emmy Awards two times.

Early life
Garry Emmanuel Shandling was born into a Jewish family in Chicago on November 29, 1949, the son of pet store proprietor Muriel Estelle (née Singer) and print shop owner Irving Shandling. He grew up in the Casa Loma Estates area of Tucson, Arizona, having moved there with his family so that his older brother Barry could receive treatment for cystic fibrosis. Barry died of the disease when Shandling was 10. After graduating from Palo Verde High School, Shandling attended the University of Arizona to major in electrical engineering, but instead completed a degree in marketing and pursued a year of postgraduate studies in creative writing.

Career

Early work
When Shandling was 19, he drove two hours to a club in Phoenix and showed some jokes to George Carlin, who was performing there. The next day, on a repeat round-trip, Carlin told him that he had "funny stuff on every page" and should keep at it. In 1973, he moved to Los Angeles and worked at an advertising agency for a time, then sold a script for the popular NBC sitcom Sanford and Son. He also wrote scripts for the sitcom Welcome Back, Kotter and attended a story meeting for Three's Company.

Stand-up comedy
Shandling said that he became a stand-up comedian because of an incident that happened one day at a story meeting for Three's Company, in which one of the show's producers complained about a line of dialogue and said, "Well, Chrissy wouldn't say that." He recalled, "I just locked. I said, 'I don't think I can do this.' And I stopped right there and went on to perform."

In 1978, Shandling performed his first stand-up routine at the Comedy Store in Los Angeles. A year later, he was one of the few performers to cross the picket line when a group of comedians organized a boycott against the Comedy Store, protesting owner Mitzi Shore's policy of not paying comedians to perform. According to William Knoedelseder, Shandling "was the scion of a family with decidedly antiunion views. He had not shared the struggling comic experience. He was a successful sitcom writer trying to break into stand-up, and prior to the strike, Shore had refused to put him in the regular lineup because she didn't think he was good enough. Of course, that changed the minute he crossed the picket line."

Shandling's onstage persona was an anxiety-ridden, nervous, uptight, conservative man on the verge of a breakdown. After a couple of years on the road, he was booked by a talent scout from The Tonight Show Starring Johnny Carson to appear as a guest in 1981. Shandling substituted for Carson on a regular basis until 1987, when he left to focus on his cable show, leaving Jay Leno as permanent guest host and Carson's eventual successor.

In 1984, Shandling performed his first stand-up special, Garry Shandling: Alone in Vegas for Showtime, followed by a second televised special in 1986, The Garry Shandling Show: 25th Anniversary Special, also for Showtime. In 1991, a third special, Garry Shandling: Stand-Up, was part of the HBO Comedy Hour.

Television series

It's Garry Shandling's Show
In 1985, Shandling and Alan Zweibel went on to create It's Garry Shandling's Show. Through 1990, it ran for 72 episodes on Showtime. The edited reruns played on the Fox network beginning in 1988. Shandling wrote 15 of the episodes.

The series subverted the standard sitcom format by having its characters openly acknowledge that they were all part of a television series. Building on a concept that hearkened back to The George Burns and Gracie Allen Show, in which George Burns would frequently break the "fourth wall" and speak directly to the audience, Shandling's series went so far as to incorporate the audience and elements of the studio itself into the storylines, calling attention to the show's artifice.

The series was nominated for four Emmy Awards, including one for Shandling. He won an American Comedy Award for Funniest Male Performance in a Series; and four CableACE awards, two for Best Comedy Series. The show also won an award for Outstanding Achievement in Comedy from the Television Critics Association.

The Larry Sanders Show

In 1992, Shandling launched another critical and commercial success by creating the mock behind-the-scenes talk show sitcom The Larry Sanders Show, which ran for 89 episodes through to 1998 on HBO. It garnered 56 Emmy Award nominations and three wins. Shandling based the series on his experiences guest-hosting The Tonight Show Starring Johnny Carson.

In 1993, NBC offered Shandling $5 million to take over Late Night when David Letterman announced his highly publicized move to CBS, but Shandling declined. He was subsequently offered The Late Late Show, but also declined in favor of continuing The Larry Sanders Show.

Shandling wrote 38 episodes of the series and directed three in its final season. He was nominated for 18 Emmy Awards for the series: five for acting, seven for writing, and six for being co-executive producer with Brad Grey. He won one Emmy Award for Outstanding Writing in a Comedy Series for the series finale "Flip." He was also nominated for two Golden Globe Awards for Best Actor (Musical or Comedy) in 1994 and 1995. He won two American Comedy Awards for Funniest Male Performance in a Comedy Series, eight CableACE Awards, and a BAFTA Award. The series  influenced other shows, such as Entourage, 30 Rock, and Curb Your Enthusiasm, where guest stars portray themselves.

In 2002, TV Guide named The Larry Sanders Show as 38th Greatest Show of All Time. In 2008, Entertainment Weekly ranked it the 28th Best Show of the past 25 years, and it was included on Time magazine's 100 Greatest Shows of All Time.

The first season was re-released in 2007, along with a Not Just the Best of the Larry Sanders Show, Shandling's picks of the best 23 episodes.

In October 2012, Shandling returned with fellow cast members from The Larry Sanders Show for Entertainment Weekly'''s Reunions issue, where he was reunited with co-stars Rip Torn, Jeffrey Tambor, Sarah Silverman, Penny Johnson Jerald, Wallace Langham and Mary Lynn Rajskub.

Other work

Shandling hosted the Grammy Awards in 1990, 1991, 1993 and 1994. He hosted the Emmy Awards in 2000 and 2004, and co-hosted (doing the opening monologue) in 2003. He appeared occasionally in films, beginning with a cameo as Mr. Vertisey in The Night We Never Met. He had supporting roles in Love Affair and Mixed Nuts; Dr. Dolittle (1998), as the voice of a live-action pigeon; the David Rabe play adaptation Hurlyburly (1998); and Trust the Man (2001). He wrote and starred in Mike Nichols's What Planet Are You From? (2000) and co-starred with Warren Beatty and others in Town & Country (2001).

In October 1999, Shandling, with David Rensin, published Confessions of a Late Night Talk Show Host: The Autobiography of Larry Sanders, written in the voice of his alter-ego Larry Sanders.

He also appeared in a brief cameo in Zoolander (2001). Again voicing an animal, Shandling co-starred as Verne in Over the Hedge (2006), which became one of his best-known roles. He appeared in Iron Man 2 (2010) as Senator Stern, and reprised the role in Captain America: The Winter Soldier (2014). He appeared in an uncredited cameo as a health inspector in The Dictator (2012).

He starred as himself representing Fox Mulder, alongside Téa Leoni as Dana Scully in The X-Files season 7 spoof episode "Hollywood A.D."

In February 2010, Shandling was staying at the same Waipio Valley hotel that Conan O'Brien checked into after his departure from The Tonight Show. They spent their entire vacations together, Shandling helping to rehabilitate O'Brien.

Shandling was a longtime friend of Jerry Seinfeld. In January 2016, he appeared on Seinfeld's show Comedians in Cars Getting Coffee.

Personal life

In 1977, Shandling was involved in a car crash in Beverly Hills that left him in critical condition for two days and hospitalized for two weeks with a crushed spleen. While in the hospital, he had a near-death experience and later said, "I had a vivid near-death experience that involved a voice asking, 'Do you want to continue leading Garry Shandling's life?' Without thinking, I said, 'Yes.' Since then, I've been stuck living in the physical world while knowing, without a doubt, that there's something much more meaningful within it all. That realization is what drives my life and work." The accident inspired him to pursue a career in comedy, and he later turned the accident into part of his routine.

Shandling never married and had no children. He shared an apartment with his fiancée, actress Linda Doucett, from 1987 until they split up in 1994. He subsequently had her dismissed from The Larry Sanders Show, and she filed a lawsuit against his production company Brillstein Entertainment Partners for sexual discrimination and wrongful termination. The case was settled out of court in 1997 for $1 million.

Shandling and Sharon Stone were students of acting coach Roy London and dated briefly, and she appeared on The Larry Sanders Show in the episode "The Mr. Sharon Stone Show". They remained close friends until Shandling's death in 2016.  In the documentary Special Thanks to Roy London, interviews with Stone and ShandlingSpecial Thanks To Roy London - Documentary discuss their relationship. A Los Angeles Times article read:

Shandling preferred to reveal little about his personal life during interviews. He was a Buddhist who enjoyed meditating, playing basketball, and boxing four times per week. He co-owned a boxing gym in Santa Monica, TSB 44 (Tough Strong Bold No. 44), with actor and director Peter Berg. He was also a licensed amateur radio operator. Starting as a teenager, he held the callsigns WA7BKG, KD6OY, and KQ6KA. The latter he held with a pseudonym, Dave Waddell, to avoid undue attention when he operated.

Death
Shandling suffered from hyperparathyroidism, a serious disease which often goes undiagnosed or untreated. If left untreated, it can lead to complications such as osteoporosis, high blood pressure, kidney stones, kidney failure, stroke, and cardiac arrhythmias.

On March 24, 2016, at the age of 66, he died at Saint John's Health Center in Santa Monica, California.@Nyltiaccc, Caitlyn Hitt. "Comedian Garry Shandling To Be Honored With Buddhist Funeral; Posthumously Made A Monk." International Business Times (USA), sec. Media & Culture, 31 Mar. 2016. NewsBank: Access World News, infoweb.newsbank.com/apps/news/document-view?p=AWNB&docref=news/15BF8E45C88CF700. Accessed 4 Sept. 2019. The LAPD reported that he had suddenly collapsed in his home and was rushed to the hospital, suffering from an apparent medical emergency. When paramedics arrived, he was unconscious. The autopsy showed that he died from a pulmonary embolism.

Shandling left behind a liquid estate worth around $668,000, which was given to his lawyer and best friend Bill Isaacson, as Shandling had no family or relatives. The bulk of his wealth, however, was held in a private trust he had created. On February 4, 2019, his estate bestowed $15.2 million to benefit medical research at the David Geffen School of Medicine at UCLA. His gift will establish and endow the Garry Shandling Endocrine Surgery Research Fund, the Garry Shandling Infectious Diseases Innovation Fund, and the Garry Shandling Pancreatic Diseases Fund. The remainder of the bequest will establish the Garry Shandling Medical Research Fund, which will operate under the direction of the medical school's dean. In his honor, UCLA also has named the Garry Shandling Learning Studio, a  multipurpose space in Geffen Hall, the school's medical education building.

Awards and nominations
During his four-decade career, Shandling was nominated for 19 Primetime Emmy Awards and two Golden Globe Awards.

Additionally, Shandling won two British Comedy Awards, twelve CableACE Awards (including eight for The Larry Sanders Show and four for It's Garry Shandling's Show), a BAFTA Award and was nominated for two Writers Guild of America Awards for The Larry Sanders Show. He received three American Comedy Awards, two Satellite Award nominations, and in 2004, he was presented with the Austin Film Festival's Outstanding Television Writer Award.

Filmography

Television

As writer

Books
 Confessions of a Late-Night Talk-show Host: The Autobiography of Larry Sanders'' was written in-character as Larry Sanders by Shandling with David Rensin. It was released October 4, 1999, and was the topic of season five's episode "The Book".

References

External links

 
 
 Garry Shandling on Charlie Rose via Google Video (2006)
  in 2002
 
 Museum of Broadcasting: It's Garry Shandling's Show / The Larry Sanders Show
 Filmbug.com: Garry Shandling
 

1949 births
2016 deaths
20th-century American comedians
20th-century American male actors
20th-century American male writers
20th-century American writers
21st-century American comedians
21st-century American male actors
21st-century American male writers
21st-century American writers
Amateur radio people
American Buddhists
American male film actors
American male television actors
American male television writers
American male voice actors
American stand-up comedians
American television directors
American television producers
American television talk show hosts
American television writers
American Zen Buddhists
Converts to Buddhism
Deaths from pulmonary embolism
Film producers from Arizona
Jewish American comedians
Jewish American male actors
Jewish American writers
Jewish male comedians
Male actors from Tucson, Arizona
Primetime Emmy Award winners
Screenwriters from Arizona
Showrunners
University of Arizona alumni
Writers from Tucson, Arizona
21st-century American Jews